Ariel Wayz (born 2000) is a Rwandan solo musician, and holds the 2022 best female artist.

Early life and education 
Wayz was born in 2000 in Rubavu, Western Province as the fifth child in a family of eight.

Her mother sung in Orchestre Ingeri during the 1990s.

She successfully auditioned for a Nyundo School of Music scholarship in 2015, starting in 2016.

Career 
Wayz was a co-founder and the vocal lead for the Symphony band.  

Her single The Boy from Us is a collaboration with Jumper Keellu and took part in the New Generation (band)'s production of the song Ndaryohewe.

In 2021, Wayz released Away.

In 2022, she released the song 10 Days with an associated music video. The video was directed by Frery Nkotanyi, produced by Kenny Pro, mixed and mastered by Davydenko and 3D Records, and features Donia Sbika.

Personal life 
Ariel Wayz has dated musical artist Juno Kizigenza.

References

External links 
 

2000 births
Living people
People from Rubavu District
Rwandan musicians